Dolphin drive hunting, also called dolphin drive fishing, is a method of hunting dolphins and occasionally other small cetaceans by driving them together with boats and then usually into a bay or onto a beach. Their escape is prevented by closing off the route to the open sea or ocean with boats and nets. Dolphins are hunted this way in several places around the world including the Solomon Islands, the Faroe Islands, Peru, and Japan which is the most well-known practitioner of the method. In large numbers dolphins are mostly hunted for their meat; some end up in dolphinariums.

Despite the controversial nature of the hunt resulting in international criticism, and the possible health risk that the often polluted meat causes, tens of thousands  of dolphins are caught in drive hunts each year.

By country

Faroe Islands 

Whaling in the Faroe Islands takes the form of beaching and slaughtering long-finned pilot whales. It has been practiced since about the time of the first Norse settlements on these North Atlantic islands, and thus can be considered aboriginal whaling. It is mentioned in the Sheep Letter, a Faroese law from 1298, a supplement to the Norwegian Gulating law.

It  is closely regulated by the Faroese authorities, with around 800 long-finned pilot whales and some Atlantic white-sided dolphins slaughtered annually; mainly during the summer. The hunts, called grindadráp in Faroese, are non-commercial and are organized on a community level. Anyone who has a special training certificate on slaughtering a pilot whale with the spinal-cord lance can participate. The police and Grindaformenn are allowed to remove people from the grind area. The hunters first surround the pilot whales with a wide semicircle of boats. The boats then drive the pilot whales into a bay or to the bottom of a fjord. Not all bays are certified, and the slaughter will only take place on a certified beach.

Many Faroese consider the whale meat an important part of their food culture and history. Animal rights groups criticize the slaughter as being cruel and unnecessary. In November 2008, Høgni Debes Joensen, chief medical officer of the Faroe Islands and Pál Weihe, scientist, have recommended in a letter to the Faroese government that pilot whales should no longer be considered fit for human consumption because of the high level of mercury, PCB and DDT derivatives. However, the Faroese government did not forbid whaling. On 1 July 2011 the Faroese Food and Veterinary Authority announced their recommendation regarding the safety of eating meat and blubber from the pilot whale, which was not as strict as the one of the chief medical officer. The new recommendation says only one dinner with whale meat and blubber per month, with a special recommendation for younger women, girls, pregnant women and breastfeeding women. From 2002 to 2009 the PCB concentration in whale meat has fallen by 75%, DDT values in the same time period have fallen by 70% and mercury levels have also fallen.

Iceland

In mid-1950s, fishermen in Iceland requested assistance from the government to remove killer whales from Icelandic waters as they damaged fishing equipment. With fisheries accounting for 20% of Iceland's employment at the time, the perceived economic impact was significant. The Icelandic government asked the United States for assistance. As a NATO ally with an air base in Iceland, the US Navy deployed Patrol Squadrons VP-18 and VP-7 to achieve this task. According to the US Navy, hundreds of animals were killed with machineguns, rockets and depth charges.

In the late 1970s, after the Marine Mammal Protection Act of 1972 and the ban on hunting killer whales in Washington in 1976 as discussed later in this article, the hunting of killer whales in Iceland resumed, this time aiming to capture live animals for the entertainment industry. The first two killer whales captured went to Dolfinarium Harderwijk in the Netherlands. One of these animals was soon after transferred to SeaWorld. These captures continued until 1989 with the additional animals going to SeaWorld, Marineland Antibes, Marineland of Canada, Kamogawa Sea World, Ocean Park Hong Kong, and Conny-Land.

Although commercial whaling does still take place in Icelandic waters today, dolphins are no longer hunted and whale watching is popular amongst tourists.

Japan 

The Taiji dolphin drive hunt captures small cetaceans for their meat and for sale to dolphinariums. Taiji has a long connection to Japanese whaling. The 2009 documentary film The Cove drew international attention to the hunt. Taiji is the only town in Japan where drive hunting still takes place on a large scale. Concern is majority through the methodology of the hunt, as actions are viewed as inhumane. An article by National Geographic refers to The Japanese Association of Zoos and Aquariums' decision to no longer support the Taiji hunt. In 2015, it was announced that there would be a ban in the buying and selling of dolphins through the means of this hunt.

Kiribati 
Similar drive hunting existed in Kiribati at least until the mid-20th century.

Peru 

Though it is forbidden under Peruvian law to hunt dolphins or eat their meat (sold as chancho marino, or sea pork in English), a large number of dolphins are still killed illegally by fishermen each year. To catch the dolphins, they are driven together with boats and encircled with nets, then harpooned, dragged on to the boat, and clubbed to death if still alive. Various species are hunted, such as the bottlenose and dusky dolphin.

According to estimates from local animal welfare organisation Mundo Azul released in October 2013, between 1,000 and 2,000 dolphins are killed annually for consumption, with a further 5,000 to 15,000 being killed for use as shark bait. Sharks are captured both for their meat and for use of their fins in shark fin soup.

Solomon Islands 

Dolphin are hunted in Malaita, in the Solomon Islands in the South Pacific, mainly for their meat and teeth, and also sometimes for live capture for dolphinariums. The hunt on South Malaita Island is smaller in scale than Tajai. After capture, the meat is shared equally between households. Dolphin teeth are also used in jewelry and as currency on the island.

Taiwan 
On the Penghu Islands in Taiwan, drive fishing of bottlenose dolphins was practiced until 1990, when the practice was outlawed by the government. Mainly Indian Ocean bottlenose dolphins but also common bottlenose dolphins were captured in these hunts.

United States

New England

From 1644 at Southampton, New York, on Long Island, the colonists established an organised whale fishery, chasing pilot whales ("blackfish") onto the shelving beaches for slaughter. They also processed drift whales they found on shore. They observed the Native Americans hunting techniques, improved on their weapons and boats, and then went out to ocean hunting.

Hawaii 
In ancient Hawaii, fishermen occasionally hunted dolphins for their meat by driving them onto the beach and killing them. In their ancient legal system, dolphin meat was considered to be kapu (forbidden) for women together with several other kinds of food. As of 2008, dolphin drive hunting no longer takes place in Hawaii.

Texas 
Hunting dolphins (at the time still often incorrectly referred to as fish or porpoises), primarily using harpoons and firearms, was considered a form of recreational hunting along the shores of the Gulf of Mexico in Texas in the late 19th and early 20th century. Pleasure dolphin hunting cruises could be booked in Corpus Christi in the 1920s, with a promise to tourists that if no successful dolphin kill was made, the excursion would be free of charge. The brutality of the practice started to spark animal welfare concerns and there is no reference of this practice still occurring in Texas after the Second World War.

Washington
Drive hunting methods were used to capture orcas in Puget Sound in the 1960s and 1970s. These hunts were led by aquarium owner and entrepreneur Edward "Ted" Griffin and his partner Don Goldsberry. After Griffin purchased an orca that was caught by accident by fishermen in Namu, British Columbia, in 1965, Griffin and Goldsberry used drive hunting techniques in the Puget Sound area to capture orcas for the entertainment industry. They implemented their new methods for orca capture in their Yukon Harbor operation in 1967. Others followed and despite the Marine Mammal Protection Act of 1972 the practice continued until 1976 when the state of Washington ordered the release of a number of orcas that were being held in Budd Inlet and subsequently banned the practice.

See also 
 Animal welfare
 Whaling

References

External links 
 atlanticblue - The inhumane dolphin slaughter in Taiji, Japan 2011
 BBC news - dining with the dolphin hunters in Japan
 Faroe Islands official whaling website
 EIA reports: Up to date info.
 EIA in the USA - reports on drive hunts: Up to date reports and info
 Atlanticblue e.V. website, with current information about the Taiji dolphin hunt in Japan (German only)
 Create worldwide awareness of dolphin slaughter and high level of toxic mercury in dolphin meat
 3D animation of how a drive works, including links to two videos
 Video at Glumbert.com - well known footage of a drive hunt in Futo in 1999
 Matt Damon Narrated Film via EducatedEarth 
 Video report produced by BlueVoice.org
 Video about the Taiji drive hunts from November 2007 produced by atlanticblue.de
 CNN report on the Taiji drive hunts, 11 February 2008.

Mercury poisoning
http://www.theage.com.au/national/mercury-poisoning-linked-to-dolphin-deaths-20080605-2mbw.html
http://search.japantimes.co.jp/cgi-bin/nn20090923f2.html
http://www.nytimes.com/2008/02/20/world/asia/20iht-dolphin.1.10223011.html

Animal welfare
Hunting
Cruelty to animals
Dolphins and humans
Environmental impact of fishing
Environmental controversies
Types of whaling